The following list sorts all cities and communes in the German state of Mecklenburg-Vorpommern with a population of more than 10,000. As of December 31, 2017, 21 cities fulfill this criterion and are listed here. This list refers only to the population of individual municipalities within their defined limits, which does not include other municipalities or suburban areas within urban agglomerations.

List 

The following table lists the 21 cities and communes in Mecklenburg-Vorpommern with a population of at least 10,000 on December 31, 2017, as estimated by the Federal Statistical Office of Germany. A city is displayed in bold if it is a state or federal capital.

 The city rank by population as of December 31, 2017, as estimated by the Federal Statistical Office of German
 The city name
 The name of the district (Landkreis) in which the city lies (some cities are districts on their own called urban districts)
 The city population as of December 31, 2017, as estimated by the Federal Statistical Office of Germany
 The city population as of May 9, 2011, as enumerated by the 2011 European Union census
 The city land area as of December 31, 2017
 The city population density as of December 31, 2017 (residents per unit of land area)

External links 
 Cities in Mecklenburg-Vorpommern by population

References 

Cities by population
Mecklenburg-Vorpommern
Cities by population